Below is a list of notable footballers who have played for MC Oran. Generally, this means players that have played 100 or more league matches for the club. However, some players who have played fewer matches are also included; this includes players that have had considerable success either at other clubs or at international level, as well as players who are well remembered by the supporters for particular reasons.

Players are listed in alphabetical order according to the date of their first-team official debut for the club. Appearances and goals are for first-team competitive matches only. Substitute appearances included. Statistics accurate as of 26 May 2019.

Key

Nationalities are indicated by the corresponding FIFA country code.

List of foreign players
*Bold International players.

Players in international competitions

World Cup Players

 World Cup 1982
  Tedj Bensaoula

 World Cup 1986
  Nacerdine Drid

Olympic Players

 1980 Summer Olympics
  Tedj Bensaoula

Africa Cup of Nations Players

 1980 African Cup of Nations
  Tedj Bensaoula

 1986 African Cup of Nations
  Nacerdine Drid

 1988 African Cup of Nations
  Lakhdar Belloumi
  Nacerdine Drid

 1990 African Cup of Nations
  Ali Benhalima
  Tahar Chérif El-Ouazzani

 1992 African Cup of Nations
  Omar Belatoui
  Abdelhafid Tasfaout

 1996 African Cup of Nations
  Omar Belatoui
  Ali Meçabih
  Abdelhafid Tasfaout
  Sid Ahmed Zerrouki

 1998 African Cup of Nations
  Sid-Ahmed Benamara
  Cheïkh Benzerga
  Abdellatif Osmane

 2000 African Cup of Nations
  Abdesslam Benabdellah
  Moulay Haddou
  Ali Meçabih

 2002 African Cup of Nations
  Moulay Haddou

 2004 African Cup of Nations
  Moulay Haddou

References

MC Oran
 
Oran
Association football player non-biographical articles